The Caddoan languages are a family of languages native to the Great Plains spoken by tribal groups of the central United States, from present-day North Dakota south to Oklahoma. All Caddoan languages are critically endangered, as the number of speakers has declined markedly due to colonial legacy, lack of support, and other factors.

Family division
Five languages belong to the Caddoan language family:

Kitsai and Wichita have no speakers left. Kitsai stopped being spoken in the 19th century when its members were absorbed into the Wichita tribe. Wichita stopped being spoken in 2016, when the last native speaker of Wichita, Doris McLemore (who left recordings and language materials), died.

All of the remaining Caddoan languages spoken today are severely endangered. As of 2007, Caddo is spoken by only 25 people, Pawnee by 10, and Arikara by 10. Caddo and Pawnee are spoken in Oklahoma by small numbers of tribal elders. Arikara is spoken on the Fort Berthold Reservation in North Dakota.

Prior to colonization and US expansion, speakers of Caddoan languages were more widespread.  The Caddo, for example, lived in northeastern Texas, southwestern Arkansas, and northwestern Louisiana, as well as southeastern Oklahoma. The Pawnee formerly lived along the Platte River in what is now Nebraska.

Prehistory

Glottochronology is a controversial method of reconstructing, in broad detail, the history of a language and its relationships. In the case of Proto-Caddoan, it appeared to have divided into two branches, Northern and Southern, more than 3000 years ago. (The division of the language implies also a geographic and/or political separation.)

South Caddoan, or Caddo proper, evolved in north-eastern Texas and adjacent Oklahoma, Arkansas, and Louisiana. Other than Caddo, no daughter languages are known, but some unrecorded ones likely existed in the 16th and the 17th centuries.

Northern Caddoan evolved into several different languages.  The language that became Wichita, with several different dialects, branched off about 2000 years ago. Kitsai separated from the Northern Caddoan stem about 1200 years ago, and Pawnee and Arikara separated 300 to 500 years ago.

External relations
Adai, a language isolate from Louisiana is known only from a 275-word list collected in 1804, and may be a Caddoan language, however documentation is too scanty to determine with certainty. Adjacent to the Caddo lived the Eyeish or Ais—not to be confused with the Ais of Florida—who also spoke a language that may have been related to Caddoan. 

Some linguists believe that the Caddoan, Iroquoian, and Siouan languages may be connected in a Macro-Siouan language family, but their work is suggestive and the theory remains hypothetical.  Similar attempts to find a connection with the Algonquian languages have been inconclusive. There is insufficient evidence for linguists to propose a hypothetical Macro-Algonquian/Iroquoian language family.

Reconstruction
Some Proto-Northern Caddoan reconstructions by Chafe (1979):

{| class="wikitable sortable"
! gloss !! Proto-Northern Caddoan !! Pawnee !! Arikara !! Wichita !! Caddo
|-
| arm || *win- || pí:ruʔ || wí:nuʔ || wi:rʔa || mí:suh
|-
| blood || *pat- || pá:tuʔ || pá:tuʔ || wa:ckicʔa || bahʔuh
|-
| bone || *kis- || kí:suʔ || čí:šuʔ || ki:sʔa || 
|-
| egg || *nipik- || ripí:kuʔ || nipí:kuʔ || nikʷi:kʔa || nibih
|-
| eye || *kirik- || kirí:kuʔ || ciríːkuʔ || kirikʔa || 
|-
| intestine || *riyac- || ré:cuʔ || né:suʔ || niya:cʔa || nahč’uh
|-
| leg || *kas- || ká:suʔ || ká:xuʔ || ka:sʔa || k’á:suh
|-
| liver || *karik- || karí:kuʔ || karí:kuʔ || karikʔa || kánk’uh
|-
| skunk || *niwit || ríwit || níwit || niwi:c || wihit
|-
| sun || *sak-(h)un- || sakú:ruʔ || šakú:nuʔ || sa:khirʔa || sak’uh
|-
| wood || *yak- || rá:kuʔ  ’box’ || há:kuʔ  ’box’ || haːkʔa/-ya:k- || yaʔk’uh
|}

For Proto-Caddoan, Chafe (1979) reconstructs the following phonemes.
stops: /p t k/
affricate: /ts/ 
spirant: /s/
resonants: /w n r/ and /j/ 
laryngeals: /ʔ h/
vowels: /i a u/

Vocabulary
Below is a list of basic vocabulary of Northern Caddoan languages from Parks (1979):

{| class="wikitable sortable"
! No. !! English !! Arikara !! Pawnee !! Kitsai !! Wichita
|-
| 1 || I || -t- || -t- || -t- || -c-
|-
| 2 || thou || -x- || -s- || -s- || -s-
|-
| 3 || we || -sir- || -cir- || -ci- (incl. dual) || -cíːy-
|-
| 4 || this || ti || ti || tiʔi || tiʔi
|-
| 5 || that || i || i || i-, anini ‘by that’ || haːríːh
|-
| 6 || chest || waːkuːkáu? || awaːkiːsuʔ || nikokíːsu || khiːkʔa
|-
| 7 || not || ka- || ka- || ka- || kírih
|-
| 8 || all || čitúːʔ || kituː || akwác || asséːhah
|-
| 9 || many || ranihuːn || kari || nirahkina ‘there are many’ || iyarhah
|-
| 10 || one || áxkux || ásku || arísku || ass
|-
| 11 || two || pítkux || pítku || cásu, cúsu || wicha
|-
| 12 || big || rihuːn || rihuːr || nikin || tac; Riwaːc
|-
| 13 || woman || sápat || cápat || cakwákt || kaːhiːkʔa
|-
| 14 || man || wíːta || píːta || wiːta || wiːc
|-
| 15 || person || sáhniš || cáhriks || kírika || ihaːs
|-
| 16 || fish || čiwáhtš || kacíːki || nitát || kaːcʔa
|-
| 17 || bird || níkus || ríkucki || kuːcáke, kucáki || ichir
|-
| 18 || dog || xáːtš || ásaːki || anúːsa || kicíyeːh
|-
| 19 || tree || naháːpi || rahaːpe || yáku (wood); ayákwi || tiyaːhkw
|-
| 20 || seed || načiríːkuʔ || rákiriːkuʔ || nikiríːkʔu || nikiːsʔa
|-
| 21 || leaf || sčeːkaráːkuʔ || kskéːkaraːkuʔ || yakánu || kíʔincaːcʔa
|-
| 22 || root || kasukaːwíuʔ || rákapahcuʔ || ayakakunayahkasa || ʔaskiːcʔa
|-
| 23 || bark || haːkiskúːxuʔ || ráːkickuːsuʔ || yakatakuác || tíːkʔacʔiyaːcʔa
|-
| 24 || skin || sahnišskúːxuʔ || ckáriːtuʔ || arahkita || kithaːrʔa
|-
| 25 || meat || tsástš || kísacki || neːtanaːs, awánas || ʔarasʔa
|-
| 26 || blood || páːtuʔ || páːtuʔ || kwáːtu || waːckicʔa
|-
| 27 || bone || číːšuʔ || kíːsuʔ || kíːsu || kiːsʔa
|-
| 28 || grease || čisahítš || kícahihtuʔ || yahtkiríyu ‘hot’; kinasíːtu ‘lard’ || kiraːsʔa
|-
| 29 || egg || nipíːkuʔ || ripíːkuʔ || nikwíːku || nikwiːkʔa
|-
| 30 || horn || aríːkuʔ || paːríːkuʔ, aríːkuʔ || aríːku || ʔarikʔa
|-
| 31 || tail || nitkúːʔ || ritkuːʔu || nitkúhu || kiːyaːkʔa
|-
| 32 || feather || híːtuʔ || íːtuʔ || híːtuʔ || niːsʔa
|-
| 33 || hair || úːxuʔ || úːsuʔ || ickóːsu || tiyaːcʔa
|-
| 34 || head || páxuʔ || páksuʔ || kwitácuʔ íckoʔo ‘about head’ || weʔekʔa
|-
| 35 || eye || čiríːkuʔ || kiríːkuʔ || kiriːkʔu || kirikʔa
|-
| 36 || nose || siníːtuʔ || icúːsuʔ || icúːsu || tisʔa
|-
| 37 || mouth || haːkáʔuʔ || háːkauʔ || háːku || haːkaʔa
|-
| 38 || tooth || áːnuʔ || áːruʔ || anhíːsuʔ || aːkʔa
|-
| 39 || tongue || háːtuʔ || háːtuʔ || háːtuʔ || hacʔa
|-
| 40 || fingernail || šwíːtuʔ || kspíːtuʔ || kskwíːtu || iskwicʔa
|-
| 41 || foot || áxuʔ || ásuʔ || asúʔ || asʔa
|-
| 42 || knee || paːčíːšuʔ || páːkiːsuʔ || kirikisnayus || kiːskwasʔa
|-
| 43 || hand || íšuʔ || íksuʔ || íksuʔ || iskʔa
|-
| 44 || neck || číːsuʔ || kíːcuʔ || natíːnu || kiticʔa
|-
| 45 || breasts || éːtuʔ || éːtuʔ || isáːtu || eːcʔa
|-
| 46 || liver || karíːkuʔ || karíːkuʔ || karíːku || karikʔa
|-
| 47 || drink || čiːka || kíːka || kíːka || -kikʔa
|-
| 48 || eat || waːwa-a || waːwa-a || wawaʔánu, wáwaʔa || -waːwaʔa
|-
| 49 || bite || kaʔus || kauc || takocóhu ‘bite it’ || -taʔa
|-
| 50 || see || ut... e.rik || ut... eːrik || tuciʔeːriksu ‘he sees it’ || ʔiːs
|-
| 51 || hear || atka-u || atka-u || atkarahkus ‘hear it’ || ʔaːckhéʔe
|-
| 52 || know || ut...reːsiːš || ir...raːʔiːta || atihayaki ‘I know it’ || wickaʔa
|-
| 53 || sleep || itka || itka || itka || -hiʔinck
|-
| 54 || die || koːt || hurahac || híːksta ‘died’ || -teʔes
|-
| 55 || kill || koːtik || kuːtik || ki || ki
|-
| 56 || swim || huːseːriːtik || huːceːriːtik || nutoceríːtik ‘he swims’ || -arhiya ‘to bathe’
|-
| 57 || fly || awanu || awari || niahak, -a- || ʔiːtoː (+loc.)ʔa
|-
| 58 || laugh || awaxk || awask || awas naʔaʔa ‘comes in air’ || -wakharikikw
|-
| 59 || come || in...a || in...a || ináhu ‘he is coming’ || u-a... ʔa
|-
| 60 || lie || ša || sa || sa || ʔirhawi
|-
| 61 || sit || kux || ku || wi || ʔicaki
|-
| 62 || stand || arič || arik || áriki || ariki
|-
| 63 || cut || kakatk || kakatk || kakatk || -kack
|-
| 64 || say || waːko || waːku || wáku || wakʔa
|-
| 65 || sun || šakúːnuʔ || sakúːruʔ || sakúːnu || saːkhirʔa
|-
| 66 || moon || páh || pá || cúhkwá || wáːh
|-
| 67 || star || sákaːʔa || úːpirit || nikwírik || híːkwirikʔa
|-
| 68 || water || tstóːxuʔ || kíːcuʔ || akicóːnu || kicʔa
|-
| 69 || rain || tsuhíːnuʔ || ácuhuːruʔ || nahacaʔa || a...hiriʔa (verb only)
|-
| 70 || stone || kanítš || karítki || kátanu || ʔikaːʔa
|-
| 71 || sand || čiwíhtuʔ || kíwiktuʔ || kiwíktu || kiːchaːrʔa
|-
| 72 || earth || hunáːnuʔ || huráːruʔ || hunáːna || hiraːrʔa
|-
| 73 || cloud || skarahkataháːnuʔ || ckáuʔ || nácton || keʔeːrʔa
|-
| 74 || smoke || naːwíːšuʔ || ráːwiːsuʔ || aːrosː || ickweʔeːkʔa
|-
| 75 || fire || čeːkáʔuʔ || keːkauʔ ‘flame’ || akiak || yecʔa (n.); -keʔe ‘be a fire’
|-
| 76 || ash || itkanahtúːsuʔ || karáktuhcuʔ || itkáːnu || ickhaːrʔa ‘dust, sand’
|-
| 77 || burn || in...kunistaʔa || kahuːriktik, ir...kunstaʔa || nahúniku, -hurik || -hiri
|-
| 78 || path || hatúːnuʔ, -sat- || hatúːruʔ || nuhyaːtáta ‘path goes’ || hachirʔa; -yac ‘to be path’
|-
| 79 || mountain || wáːʔuʔ || wáːuʔ || arakauh || nawaːreʔerhárih ‘where there are mountains’
|-
| 80 || red || pahaːt || pahaːt || kwahtnyú || kwaːc
|-
| 81 || blue || tareːʔuːx || tareːʔuːs || arayósː || kawʔac
|-
| 82 || yellow || rahkatáːn || rahkataːr || kisísː, kwanis || narisis
|-
| 83 || white || čiːsawatáːn || taːkaːr || kahcnú || khac
|-
| 84 || black || katíːt || katíːt || katinuk || kaːrʔiːs
|-
| 85 || night || nitkaháːnuʔ || rátkahaːruʔ || natki- || ckhaːrʔa
|-
| 86 || hot || in...awiristo || ir...awirictu || rahtátkiu ‘it’s hot’ || wariːckhaːrʔa
|-
| 87 || cold || in...raːnanaːxitu || ir...raraːsitu || nahenóːku ‘it’s cold’ || -hkwic
|-
| 88 || sated || kaːwačiːt || kaːwakiːt || ahinoːsana ‘becomes sated’ || tawaːwi
|-
| 89 || good || un...heːr || ur...heːr || ickuruːku, ickorók || acs
|-
| 90 || round || riwiru || riwiru || ariwíok || táriwiːk
|-
| 91 || three || tawihk- || tawihk- || táwihko || tawhaː
|-
| 92 || grass || húːnuʔ || íːruʔ || acíːu || híːyaːkhaːrʔa
|-
| 93 || guts || néːsuʔ || réːcuʔ || kiréːcu, kiriacu || niyaːcʔa
|-
| 94 || wind || hutúːnuʔ || hutúːruʔ || hutúːnu || niweʔéːrʔa
|-
| 95 || foggy || pihuː || pihuː || rúsca || -ʔiskwaːwi
|-
| 96 || urinate || kaːsuː || kaːcuː || wíahas ‘he urinates’ || -aːhas
|-
| 97 || tie || ut...tareːpi || ut...tareːpu || atonocakósk ‘I tie it’ || -thiyaki
|-
| 98 || sing || raːkaroːk || raːkaruːk || kurawáknu ‘he is singing’ || kiraːh
|-
| 99 || spit out || hawat || hawat || ahatkicowati ‘he spits’ || hawati
|-
| 100 || cry || čikak || kikak || akikakóhu || ʔiriki
|}

Notes

Further reading
 Campbell, Lyle. (1997). American Indian Languages: The Historical Linguistics of Native America. New York: Oxford University Press. .
 Chafe, Wallace L. (1973). Siouan, Iroquoian, and Caddoan. In T. Sebeok (Ed.), Current Trends in Linguistics (Vol. 10, pp. 1164–1209). The Hague: Mouton. (Reprinted as Chafe 1976).
 Chafe, Wallace L. (1976). "Siouan, Iroquoian, and Caddoan", In T. Sebeok (Ed.), Native Languages in the Americas (pp. 527–572). New York: Plenum. (Originally published as Chafe 1973).
 Chafe, Wallace L. (1976). The Caddoan, Iroquioan, and Siouan languages. Trends in Linguistics; State-of-the-art report (No. 3). The Hague: Mouton. .
 Chafe, Wallace L. (1979). Caddoan. In L. Campbell & M. Mithun (Eds.), The languages of Native America: Historical and Comparative Assessment (pp. 213–235). Austin: University of Texas Press. .
 Chafe, Wallace L. (1993). "Indian Languages: Siouan–Caddoan". Encyclopedia of the North American colonies (Vol. 3). New York: C. Scribner's Sons .
 Lesser, Alexander; & Weltfish, Gene. (1932). "Composition of the Caddoan linguistic stock". Smithsonian Miscellaneous Collections, 87 (6), 1-15.
 Melnar, Lynette R. Caddo Verb Morphology(2004) University of Nebraska Press, 
 Mithun, Marianne. (1999). The Languages of Native North America. Cambridge: Cambridge University Press.  (hbk); .
 Taylor, Allan. (1963). "Comparative Caddoan",  International Journal of American Linguistics, 29, 113-131.

External links

 American Indian Studies Research Institute's Northern Caddoan Linguistic Text Corpora, Indiana University-Bloomington
 Dictionary Database Search (includes Arikara, Skiri Pawnee, South Band Pawnee, Assiniboine [Nakoda], and Yanktonai Sioux [Dakota]), Indiana University

 
Language families
Caddo